Engineer Abul Kalam ( 25 November 1923 – 9 May 2013) was a Pakistani educator and engineer who was the longest serving vice-chancellor of the NED University of Engineering and Technology. He served between 1996 and 2013.

He died at the age of 90 in Karachi.

References

1923 births
2013 deaths
Vice-Chancellors of the NED University of Engineering & Technology
Pakistani educators
Loyola College, Chennai alumni
Muhajir people